Bilal El-Masri (born 17 May 1968) is a Lebanese boxer. He competed in the men's light welterweight event at the 1988 Summer Olympics.

References

External links
 

1968 births
Living people
Lebanese male boxers
Olympic boxers of Lebanon
Boxers at the 1988 Summer Olympics
Place of birth missing (living people)
Light-welterweight boxers